Founded in 1966, the American Subcontractors Association, Inc., is an IRS section 501(c)(6) non-profit, national, membership trade association of construction specialty trade contractors, suppliers, and service providers in the United States and Canada. It charters local chapters and state organizations across the United States, and its national headquarters is located in Alexandria, Virginia.

See also
 industry trade group
 construction
 voluntary association
 subcontractor

External links
 American Subcontractors Association

Trade associations based in the United States